Malangwa (Nepali: मलंगवा) is a town, a municipality, and the headquarters of Sarlahi District in Province No. 2 of Nepal. The district's oldest municipality, it is in parliamentary constituency 2. There is a customs checkpoint at the border crossing.

Etymology
Its name is derived from Malang Baba, a saint who is worshiped by both Hindu and Muslim. An annual fair is held in his honor during the month of Chaitra Malangbaba puja at which people offer chadar and pray for their well-being.

Demographics
According to the municipality, Malangwa had a 2012 population of 46,516 people in about 7,500 households. Most had Madhesi( Bhraman, Kayastha, sahuji/sah, koeri and yadav), Newari and Marwadi backgrounds.

Climate

More than 80 percent of the total annual rainfall occurs during the monsoon season, from June to September.

In the past, the inner and outer Terai were a formidable barrier between Nepal and potential invaders from India. The Terai's marshes and forests were infested with anopheline mosquitos which carried virulent strains of malaria, especially during the hot spring and rainy summer monsoon.

There are several climatic differences in climate among the eastern edge of the Terai (Biratnagar), the western edge (Nepaljung) and Malangwa, although all are on the same plain. The climate is more continental inland (away from Bay of Bengal monsoon sources), with a greater difference between summer and winter. In the far western Terai (five degrees of latitude further north), the coldest months average  cooler. Total rainfall diminishes from east to west. The monsoon arrives later, is less intense and ends sooner. However, winters are wetter in the west.

Location
Malangwa is bordered on the north by kabilasi Municipality; on the south and southeast by Sonbarsha, Sitamarhi district, Bihar, India; on the east by Brahampuri Rural Municipality on the west by Kaudena Rural Municipality.

Malangwa shares a border crossing with India. No documents are required to cross the border, but many edible and electronics products are restricted. A customs office tracks vehicles entering Malangwa with an Indian vehicle registration number, and taxes are imposed on heavy items entering Nepal.

Media and telecommunications

To promote local culture, Malangwa has four FM community radio stations: Radio Madhesh (89.3 MHz), Radio Malangwa (93.6), Swarnim FM (96.3) and My FM (107.4). Major daily newspapers are the Madhesh Post, Loktantrik, the Sarlahi Times and the Sapthaik Times.

Nepal Telecom have 4G network coverage with better speed and Ncell have 3G network coverage; UTL Nepal and Smart Cell are other available cellular networks. ADSL, Nepal Telecom, NCELL and a private internet service are Internet service providers in the town.

Cinemas
Malangwa has two movie theaters, which attract cross-border audiences. These are Raj Shree Cinema and Pushpa Talkies. The theaters show Nepali, Bollywood, South indian hindi dubbed and Bhojpuri-language Movies.

Attacks

Two attacks have occurred in Malangwa, the first at the end of the Nepalese Civil War. The town was attacked by Maoists on April 5, 2006, at 8:00 pm. The insurgents fired at soldiers guarding government offices and security posts and attacked a jail, freeing more than 100 inmates (including some of their comrades) before fleeing. The Russian-built, night-vision-equipped MI-17 helicopter with the call sign RAN-37 took off from Kathmandu at 10 pm to counter the attack. Eyewitnesses reported that the helicopter hovered for an hour, returned after refueling in Simra and exploded in mid-air at about 1:30 am; eight of the 10 soldiers aboard were killed. Five police personnel, four Maoists and two civilians were reported killed in clashes. Security personnel, including Chief District Officer Bhojraj Adhikari, were abducted and later released. A high alert was sounded along the  Indo-Nepal border immediately after the incident. Across the border in India, a joint Sashastra Seema Bal and CRPF team maintained surveillance on the border to thwart any further attacks.

On September 13, 2013, 10 people were injured (three critically) when a bomb exploded in a district office at about 11:45 am. Office records were destroyed in the ensuing fire.

Earthquakes
Although Malangwa experienced severe tremors from the April 2015 Nepal earthquake, it had no significant damage. However, the town was destroyed by the 1934 Nepal–Bihar earthquake.

Sports

The most popular sports in Malangwa are cricket and football. For sports, Two playgrounds are used mostly for sports: Covered Hall & DDC Field.

Transport

Malangwa,  by road from Kathmandu, is connected to other parts of the country by bus. Bus service runs to Kathmandu, Birgunj, Janakpurdham, Pokhara, Biratnagar, Dharan, Gaur, and Bharatpur, and the town has one of Nepal's largest bus stations. The Malangwa-Nawalpur Highway (MG Highway) joins the East-West Highway at Nawalpur, connecting Malangwa to all major Nepalese cities.

The nearest domestic airport, Janakpur Airport, is in Dhanusha District; Nijgadh International Airport is under construction in Nijgadh. International passengers use Kathmandu's Tribhuvan International Airport for international flight.

All major cities of India may be reached on Indian Railways, and the government of India has built a four-lane highway from Sonbarsha to Patna.

Cycles, rickshaws and taxis serve the city center, and auto rickshaws are available for longer distances. Electric rickshaws are popular.

Tourism

A number of tourists access the border connection with India and visit temples in Malangwa like Malangbaba, Durga Devi Temple, Rajdevi Temple, etc.

Notable residents
 Bishwonath Upadhyaya
 Rajendra Mahato
 abdul rahim

References

Municipalities in Madhesh Province
Nepal municipalities established in 1986
Populated places in Sarlahi District
Transit and customs posts along the India–Nepal border